John Beirne (1 April 1893 – 23 October 1967) was an Irish Clann na Talmhan politician. A shopkeeper and farmer, Beirne was first elected to Dáil Éireann at the 1943 general election as a Clann na Talmhan Teachta Dála (TD) for the Roscommon constituency. 

He was re-elected at the 1944, 1948, 1951, 1954 and 1957 general elections. He lost his seat at the 1961 general election.

Notes

References

1893 births
1967 deaths
Clann na Talmhan TDs
Members of the 11th Dáil
Members of the 12th Dáil
Members of the 13th Dáil
Members of the 14th Dáil
Members of the 15th Dáil
Members of the 16th Dáil
Politicians from County Roscommon
20th-century Irish farmers